Ose is a small coastal settlement of Loch Bracadale, in the Scottish Highland area. It lies on the west coast of the Isle of Skye between Dunvegan and Struan; the A863 road passes through Ose between Dunvegan to the north and the Skye Bridge to the south and east.

External links

Populated places in the Isle of Skye